The eleventh season of Australian reality television series The Block premiered on 6 September 2015 on the Nine Network. Scott Cam (host) and Shelley Craft (Challenge Master) return from the previous season, as did the three judges: Neale Whitaker, Shaynna Blaze and Darren Palmer. The first preview was shown on August 4, 2015. This season was also known by the name The Block: Blocktagon, but was the first since the second season to not include the season title on-screen.

Production
Nine renewed The Block for an eleventh season in April 2015, with production commencing in May 2015. The season was announced as going 'back-to-basics' after ratings declines during the tenth season, seeing episodes cut from 90 to 60 minutes, fewer episodes, the eliminations will be removed and Thursday night episodes dropped.

This former hotel is located at 5 Commercial Road in South Yarrow.

Filming for the eleventh began on 15 May 2015. The season renovated the former Hotel Saville in South Yarra - an octagonal, eight floor brick building.

Co-creator Julian Cress said that this season of The Block will have no tradies and only passionate do-it-yourself couples, in other seasons of The Block, at least one person in each team has a trade. The change comes in the new direction in the back-to-basics change to the season, he said viewers will relate more to the characters who are big on spirit but small on skills when the show returns later this year.

The Blocktagon building is now listed in the international list of Octagonal Buildings & Structures.

Contestants
The Block: Blocktagon is the third season to have five couples instead of the traditional four couples.

Score history

Results

Room reveals

Judges' scores
 Colour key:
  Highest Score
  Lowest Score

Challenge Apartment

Challenge Scores

Auction

Ratings

Controversy

On 10 November 2015, it was reported that contestant Suzi Taylor had collapsed on set, a Nine Network spokeswoman Victoria Buchan said: "Suzi was suffering from exhaustion after a busy day with The Block open for inspections.", but on 12 November 2015, Ms Taylor had a photo captured of her naked on a boat after oaks day in Melbourne, it had then been reported that her collapse was caused by "non-stop partying" throughout the Spring Racing Carnival and not exhaustion, due to this Ms Taylor was "canned" by Nine with all her promotional commitments being cut off until after the auction.

Ms Taylor has since been threatened to lose her payout of $174,500 after ignoring the terms her contract which states she shall not undertake any media interviews without the program's consent until her contract with Channel Nine is up.

Notes
Ratings data used is from OzTAM and represents the live and same day average viewership from the 5 largest Australian metropolitan centres (Sydney, Melbourne, Brisbane, Perth and Adelaide).
Luke & Ebony were former elimination contestants on Triple Threat, but they did not make it through
Aired on Monday due to NRL Grand Final
In the Coffee Challenge, teams had to create a cafe concept which will be created on the first level of The Block, Luke & Ebony and Andrew and Whitney both won. The cafe will have a combined name of both of their cafe names, Luke & Ebony "Mr Bisley", Andrew & Whitney "A Shot of Zen" will become "Mister Zen"
Shay and Dean received low scores because they couldn't finish their room due to swapping their Living Room with the kitchen
Re-Do Rooms:Kingi & Caro - Living RoomDean & Shay - Living Room & FoyerAndrew & Whitney - Master BedroomSuzi & Voni - Living Room & FoyerLuke & Ebony- Master Bedroom & FoyerThe winner of this room received $10,000 to put in their apartment which is a gift to the buyer of their apartment
The contestants have 2 choices with the prize money they have won. these are:•Spend the money to fix their apartments or;•Take it off their reserve
Timeslot changed due to the Cricket Test
Aired on Monday due to Cricket Test
In order of winning, the contestants chose their auction order
Along with being first to pick their auction order, the winner will receive a brand new Suzuki Grand Vitara to go in their Apartments garage which will be a gift to the buyer of their apartment
Andrew & Whitney announced during the Grand Final that they had ended their relationship

References

2015 Australian television seasons
11